Dame Marie; also City of Dame Marie, Dame Marie City is the principal town of the Dame-Marie commune of the Anse d'Hainault Arrondissement, in the Grand'Anse department of Haiti.

Populated places in Grand'Anse (department)